Wietze is a municipality in the district of Celle, in Lower Saxony, Germany. It is situated at the confluence of the river Aller and its tributary Wietze, approx. 15 km west of Celle. It is the site of the German Oil Museum.

References

Celle (district)